The Windsor Magazine was a monthly illustrated publication produced by Ward Lock & Co from January 1895 to September 1939 (537 issues).

The title page described it as "An Illustrated Monthly for Men and Women".

It was bound as six-monthly volumes, with the exception of Volume IV and the final volume, LXXXX (XC).

Cover designs

Until June 1917 the monthly magazine had a standard cover design, showing the title as "The Windsor Magazine", a sketch of Windsor Castle, and the volume number, month, and issue number in a panel at the foot. The December issues had this layout in colour, while the other months were on green paper with the magazine's name in a red block.

Possibly in connection with the Royal family's decision to become the House of Windsor in July 1917, that month the magazine had a make-over, and the new covers dispensed with the sketch of Windsor Castle and the word "Magazine" and instead proclaimed it as "The July (August, September, October etc.) Windsor", with the issue and volume number shown below, and a different cover painting, usually featuring a young woman, each month. Subsequently the issue and volume number disappeared from the front page, and while the issue number, month and year continued to appear on the spine, the volume number was no longer quoted externally. Latterly the subject of the cover paintings became more varied, while in the mid-1930s the word "Magazine" re-appeared on the front cover for a number of issues before again being dropped.

Editors
 Stanhope W. Sprigg (January to December 1895)
 David Williamson (January 1896-May 1898)
 Arthur Hutchinson (June 1898-August 1927) - died 26 August 1927 aged 57
 Harry Golding (September 1927 to September 1939)

Writers

Writers for the magazine included the following:

 Robert Barr
 Arnold Bennett
 Harold Bindloss
 Guy Boothby
 Leslie Charteris
 Arthur Conan Doyle
 Wyatt Earp
 Charlotte O'Conor Eccles
 Rider Haggard (whose Ayesha was serialised in 1904–05)
 Anthony Hope (whose Sophy of Kravonia was serialised in 1905–06)
 Jerome K. Jerome
 Rudyard Kipling whose Stalky & Co. was serialised in 1898–99
 Jack London
 Archibald Marshall
 L. T. Meade
 E. Nesbit
 Owen Oliver
 E. Phillips Oppenheim
 Barry Pain
 Max Pemberton
 Eden Phillpotts
 Horace Annesley Vachell
 Edgar Wallace
 Hugh Walpole
 Herbert Westbrook
 Fred M. White
 Mrs C. N. Williamson
 Dornford Yates (who first appeared in issue 201 dated September 1911 with the story, "The Busy Bees" and subsequently became a regular contributor to the magazine, providing 123 stories including "His Brother's Wife" which appeared in the final issue, 537, in September 1939.
 Israel Zangwill

Artists 
Artists whose illustrations were published in the magazine included the following:

 Salomon van Abbé
 Harold Copping
 Maurice Greiffenhagen
 George Wylie Hutchinson
 E G Oakdale
 Norah Schlegel (1879-1963) - born in Gateshead, daughter of Frederick, a Danish-born provisions importer
 Steven Spurrier
 George Cecil Wilmshurst (1873-1930) - born in Walton-on-the-Naze

Volumes continued to run from December to May and June to November thereafter, except for the final volume, 90 (LXXXX or XC) which covered the last four issues, from June to September 1939.

On 13 September 1939 (12 days after the outbreak of the Second World War) The Times carried a news article stating "The proprietors and publishers of the Windsor Magazine announce that in the present difficult circumstances it has been decided to suspend publication as from the September number, just issued." Publication was never resumed.

Further reading
 Vaughan-Pow, Catherine. The Windsor Magazine (1895-1910) - Indexes to Fiction
 Edward Liveing Adventure in Publishing: The House of Ward Lock, 1854-1954 (Ward Lock 1954)

References

External links

The Windsor Magazine at The Fiction Mags Index

Monthly magazines published in the United Kingdom
Defunct magazines published in the United Kingdom
Magazines established in 1895
Magazines disestablished in 1939